Caroline Love Goodwin O'Day (June 22, 1869 – January 4, 1943) was an American politician who served four terms in the U.S. House of Representatives from 1935 to 1943. She was the third woman, and first woman Democrat, elected to Congress from New York.

Life
Caroline Goodwin (or Carrie as she was known to her family) was born June 22, 1869. She was the daughter and first child of Sidney Prior Goodwin, a descendant of Ozias Goodwin who emigrated to Massachusetts from England in 1639; and Mary Elia Warren. Her father was a planter residing in Savannah, Georgia, who served in the Oglethorpe Light Infantry of the Confederate States Army. He surrendered and was paroled in April 1865. (Goodwin James J., The Goodwins of Hartford, Connecticut, Brown & Gross 1891, page 668).

Caroline graduated from Lucy Cobb Institute in Athens, Georgia. She studied art in Paris, Munich, and Holland. On April 20, 1901, she married Daniel O'Day, who served as secretary and treasurer of Standard Oil Company.

She was President of the Rye School Board. She was a commissioner of the State Board of Social Welfare from 1923 to 1934.

She was vice chairwoman of the New York State Democratic Committee from 1916 to 1920, and Associate Chairwoman from 1923 to 1942. She was a delegate to the 1924, 1928, 1932 and 1936 Democratic National Conventions.

Tenure in Congress 
In 1934, 1936, 1938 and 1940, O'Day was elected at-large as a Democrat to the 74th, 75th, 76th and 77th United States Congresses, holding office from January 3, 1935, to January 3, 1943.

While in the House, she was Chairwoman of the Committee on Election of President, Vice President, and Representatives (75th through 77th Congresses). Among the legislation she sponsored or co-sponsored was the Wagner-O'Day Act, the predecessor to the Javits-Wagner-O'Day Act.

In 1939 she criticized the Daughters of the American Revolution when they refused to allow Marian Anderson, who was African-American, to perform at the DAR Constitution Hall.

She died on January 4, 1943, the day after leaving Congress after four terms in office. She was buried at the Kensico Cemetery in Valhalla, New York.

Legacy
The United States Post Office – Rye was renamed the Caroline O'Day Post Office on October 23, 2010, in recognition of her public service.

See also
Women in the United States House of Representatives

References

Bio at the Eleanor Roosevelt Papers project

|-

1869 births
1943 deaths
Burials at Kensico Cemetery
Democratic Party members of the United States House of Representatives from New York (state)
Female members of the United States House of Representatives
People from Perry, Georgia
People from Rye, New York
Women in New York (state) politics
20th-century American politicians
20th-century American women politicians